Jean Fréour (8 August 1919 – 11 June 2010) was a prominent Breton sculptor.

Fréour was born in Nantes. He studied at the Bordeaux School of the Fine arts and attended the classes of Louis-Henry Bouchard in the national School of the Fine arts in Paris. He is a member of the Breton artistic movement Seiz Breur.

In the mid-1950s he settled in the Breton south coast town of Batz-sur-Mer. For a period of a year, he was mayor of the town.

In his work, Fréour uses different materials, including the schist, marble, onyx, and wood. His sculptures often carry a stamp of Breton identity impregnated with Catholicism.

He is the author of the statue of Anne of Brittany (made of bronze and erected in the city of Nantes in 2002).

The works of Jean Fréour gives details of Fréours work.

External links 
 Bronze statue  Anne de Bretagne by Jean Fréour
 Monument by Fréour to First World War soldiers at the Saint-Charles de Potyze Cemetery

1919 births
20th-century French sculptors
French male sculptors
21st-century French sculptors
21st-century French male artists
Breton artists
Artists from Nantes
2010 deaths